The Huffman Covered Bridge was built in 1914 south of Middleburg, Ohio. The property was listed on the National Register on March 4, 1975.

The wooden Kingpost truss bridge stood 50 feet long over the Middle Fork Duck Creek. The bridge stood until a devastating flood washed out the supports in 1998, carrying away the bridge. The same flood took with it six victims.

References

External links
 Photo of the bridge

Covered bridges on the National Register of Historic Places in Ohio
Buildings and structures in Noble County, Ohio
National Register of Historic Places in Noble County, Ohio
Bridges completed in 1914
Wooden bridges in Ohio
Transportation in Noble County, Ohio
Road bridges on the National Register of Historic Places in Ohio
King post truss bridges in the United States